The 1991–92 Israel State Cup (Gvia HaMedina) was the 53rd season of Israel's nationwide football cup competition and the 38th after the Israeli Declaration of Independence.

The competition was won by Hapoel Petah Tikva who have beaten Maccabi Tel Aviv 3–1 in the final.

The winner, Hapoel Petah Tikva, qualified to the 1992–93 European Cup Winners' Cup, entering in the qualifying round.

Results

Round of 16

|}

Quarter-finals

|}

Semi-finals

Final

References
100 Years of Football 1906–2006, Elisha Shohat (Israel), 2006, pp. 286–7
 Hapoel Petah Tikva – Maccabi Tel Aviv, State Cup 1991/1992 – The final youtube.com

Israel State Cup
State Cup
Israel State Cup seasons